Magyar Hírmondó was the first newspaper to be published in the Hungarian language in Bratislava. The first issue appeared on 1 January 1780. Its founders were Mátyás Rát, a Lutheran pastor and Ferenc Ágoston Patzkó, a publisher from Bratislava. The latter was also the publisher. The paper was published in octavo format (a single column on half a printed sheet) twice a week, on Wednesdays and Saturdays. Mátyás Rát was the editor of the paper from its foundation in 1780 to 1782. Magyar Hírmondó folded in 1788.

References

1780 establishments in the Habsburg monarchy
18th-century establishments in Hungary
Defunct newspapers published in Slovakia
Defunct weekly newspapers
Hungarian-language newspapers
Mass media in Bratislava
Newspapers established in 1780
Publications disestablished in 1788